USS S-21 (SS-126) was a first-group (S-1 or "Holland") S-class submarine of the United States Navy in commission from 1921 to 1922 and from 1923 to 1942. In 1928, she made the first gravimetric measurements ever made aboard a U.S. ship at sea. Prior to World War II, she operated in the Atlantic Ocean, Caribbean Sea, and Pacific Ocean, and after the United States entered the war, she operated off Panama. She then served in the Royal Navy as HMS P.553 from 1942 to 1944.

Construction and commissioning
S-21′s keel was laid down on 19 December 1918 by the Bethlehem Shipbuilding Corporation's Fore River Shipyard at Quincy, Massachusetts. She was launched on 18 August 1920, sponsored by Mrs. Thomas Baxter, and commissioned on 24 August 1921.

Service history

U.S. Navy

1921–1928
Following operations from New London, Connecticut, S-21 was decommissioned and returned to her builder on 31 March 1922. After she was reacquired by the Navy, S-21 recommissioned at Groton, Connecticut, on 14 September 1923. S-21 then operated off the northeastern coast of the United States. She also visited the Panama Canal, Saint Thomas in the United States Virgin Islands, and Trinidad between January and April 1924; departed New London on 25 November 1924 and visited Hawaii from 27 April to 25 May 1925 before returning to New London in July 1925; performed duty in the Panama Canal area from February through April 1926; visited Kingston, Jamaica, from 20 to 28 March 1927; and operated in the Panama Canal area again from February to April 1928.

First U.S. gravity measurements at sea

A Royal Navy submarine had made the first gravity measurements at sea in 1926, and the Carnegie Institution for Science subsequently proposed that the United States take such measurements in the Caribbean Sea using a gravimeter designed by Dr. Felix Andries Vening Meinesz. Such measurements required the stability and lack of motion only attainable at sea if taken aboard a submerged submarine. S-21 was selected for the expedition, which was arranged with assistance from the United States National Academy of Sciences, the United States Coast and Geodetic Survey, the United States Naval Observatory — which provided special chronometers necessary for the gravimetric observations — and the United States Navy Hydrographic Office. Meinesz accompanied the expedition, with Elmer B. Collins aboard S-21 to represent the U.S. Navy Hydrographic Office and two Eagle-class patrol craft — USS Eagle 35 and USS Eagle 58 — serving as tenders.

The expedition set out from Hampton Roads, Virginia, on 4 October 1928 and followed a route that took it to Key West, Florida; Galveston, Texas; Guantanamo Bay, Cuba; the United States Virgin Islands; and Puerto Rico, with a return to Hampton Roads on 30 November 1928. The gravity measurements were accompanied by a sonic depth sounding with results published on a chart produced by the U.S. Navy Hydrographic Office. The gravity measurements were used in determining the shape of the Earth, and of particular interest were significant negative gravity anomalies the expedition detected.

The results of the expedition, particularly the negative anomalies, created interest in a second U.S. gravimetric expedition at sea, resulting in the Navy-Princeton gravity expedition to the West Indies in 1932 using the submarine  and a third measurement effort in 1936–1937 — the Gravimetric Survey Expedition — using the submarine .

1928–1941
After returning from her gravimetric expedition, S-21 resumed operations from New London along the northeast coast of the United States. She also served in the Panama Canal area from March to April 1929 and again from January through February 1930.

Departing New London on 22 October 1930, S-21 transited via the Panama Canal and California to Pearl Harbor, Hawaii, arriving there on 7 December 1930. From 1931 into 1938, S-21 operated from Pearl Harbor, with the period 18 November 1932 to 24 January 1934 spent in reserve.

Departing Pearl Harbor on 15 October 1938, S-21 transited via California and the Panama Canal to Philadelphia, Pennsylvania, arriving on 11 December 1938. Following overhaul she arrived at New London on 25 March 1939. She remained at New London with a partial crew from 1 June 1939 until 1 September 1940, when she returned to full commission with a full crew.

World War II
The United States entered World War II with the Japanese attack on Pearl Harbor on 7 December 1941. On 9 December 1941, S-21 got underway from New London bound for the Panama Canal Zone. Arriving on 19 December 1941, she conducted defensive war patrols in the Pacific Ocean approaches to the Panama Canal through May 1942, although her second such patrol, scheduled for 24 January to 7 February 1942, was cancelled to allow her to participate in search and rescue operations for the submarine , which had sunk on the evening of 24 January after the submarine chaser PC-460 accidentally rammed her.

In June 1942, S-21 returned to New London. On 14 September 1942, she was decommissioned.

Royal Navy
On the day of her decommissioning, S-21 was transferred to the United Kingdom. As HMS P.553, she served in the Royal Navy until returned to the U.S. Navy at Philadelphia on 11 July 1944.

Disposal
After her return, the U.S. Navy used S-21 as a target.

References

External links
Naval Oceanographic Office - Historical Timeline
Plate tectonics: an insider's history of the modern theory of the Earth, by Naomi Oreskes, Homer Eugene LeGrand
Eagle Class Patrol Vessel (PE) description

 

United States S-class submarines
Ships built in Quincy, Massachusetts
1920 ships
World War II submarines of the United States
Ships transferred from the United States Navy to the Royal Navy
United States S-class submarines of the Royal Navy
World War II submarines of the United Kingdom
Ships sunk as targets
Maritime incidents in March 1945
Shipwrecks of the Maine coast